George Arthur Gillett (23 April 1877 – 12 September 1956) was a New Zealand multi-code footballer of the early 20th century and a dual-code rugby international. Gillett died in 1956 in Onehunga.

Early years
Born in Leeston, Gillett received his education at Hamilton East School and went on to represent Thames, and then Auckland in rugby union in 1899.

Australian rules football
After serving in the South African war, he lived in Kalgoorlie and whilst there played Australian rules football and was a member of the Western Australia state team.

Return to New Zealand and rugby union
Gillett returned to New Zealand in 1905 where he lived in Christchurch and played for the Merivale club. He was selected for the 1905–06 Original All Blacks tour without having played a game for Canterbury. On that tour he played 25 of the 35 matches including his first Test cap for New Zealand on 18 November 1905 against Scotland and the famous Match of the Century against Wales. In total he played 30 matches during the period of 1905 to 1908 including eight Tests.

Gillett made an Australian rules appearance at the 1908 Melbourne Carnival, representing New Zealand in Australian rules for the first time.

Rugby league
Gillett joined the Newton Rangers in the Auckland rugby league competition. He played for them in 1911 and 1912. After switching to rugby league Gillett toured Australia with the 1911 New Zealand national team playing in 7 matches. Prior to the tour he played for New Zealand against Auckland and scored a try. He was one of four New Zealanders who toured Britain with the 1911–12 Australasian team. He only played in four of the 35 tour matches and but no Tests. Gillett coached the 1912 New Zealand side who played the touring New South Wales team. Remarkably he did not play a single game of club rugby league or a single game for Auckland.

He later became the New Zealand Rugby League's official organiser, helping to promote the game particularly in the Thames and Wellington areas.

In 1914 he attempted to switch from Newton Rangers to City Rovers but was denied by the league and his Newton Rangers club. He later tried to join Ponsonby United and after initially being refused his application was eventually accepted. He played 4 matches for them at the end of the season and then retired from the game. In the same year he was also the coach of the newly formed Remuera League Football Club.

In 1938 he donated a trophy to the Auckland Rugby League. It was decided to award it to the winner of the 4th grade competition which in its first season was the City Rovers side.

Heroism
In 1908, the touring Anglo-Welsh team were departing by ship when one of their players, Percy Down, fell overboard. Gillett, along with Arthur 'Bolla' Francis and two others, dived into the water and kept Down afloat until a rope was lowered from the ship.

References

External links

1877 births
1956 deaths
Auckland rugby league team players
Australasia rugby league team players
Australia national rugby league team players
Australian military personnel of the Second Boer War
Dual-code rugby internationals
New Zealand international rugby union players
New Zealand national rugby league team coaches
New Zealand national rugby league team players
New Zealand players of Australian rules football
New Zealand rugby league administrators
New Zealand rugby league coaches
New Zealand rugby league players
New Zealand rugby union players
Newton Rangers players
People from Leeston
Ponsonby Ponies players
Ponsonby RFC players
Rugby league fullbacks